The Hong Kong section of the Guangzhou–Shenzhen–Hong Kong Express Rail Link (sometimes abbreviated "XRL HK section") is a  long stretch of high-speed rail that links Hong Kong to mainland China. It is one of the most expensive infrastructure undertakings in Hong Kong's history. The line connects Kowloon with the high-speed rail network of China at Futian station in Shenzhen, then running north towards the commercial hub of Guangzhou.

The railway is the first high-speed rail link between mainland China and Hong Kong; it roughly halved travel time between Hong Kong and Guangzhou and connected Hong Kong to most major mainland Chinese cities via the country's extensive high-speed railway network. Construction began in 2011 and was hampered by construction delays and political controversy. It opened for commercial service on 23 September 2018.

Unlike the rest of Hong Kong, the passenger compartments of trains operating on the Hong Kong Express Rail Link are legally defined as part of the Mainland Port Area and subject to the laws of mainland China.

History
In April 2007, the Executive Council assigned the task of planning and design of the Hong Kong section of the Guangzhou–Shenzhen–Hong Kong Express Rail Link (XRL) to the MTR Corporation Limited (MTRCL). Government projections indicate that the XRL will carry about 100,000 passengers daily in 2020 and 120,000 passengers in 2030, generating an economic benefit of HK$83 billion over the next 50 years in terms of travelling time saved. Construction costs were estimated at HK$39.5 billion (US$5 billion), giving an economic internal rate of return of about 9%. The government stated the objectives were to "reinforce Hong Kong's position as the transport hub in southern China and integrate Hong Kong into Mainland China's rapidly growing express rail network", and promoting cultural tourism. It also argued that shortening the travelling time between Hong Kong and Guangzhou to just under 50 minuteshalf the current journey time would save "HK$83 billion over the next 50 years in terms of travelling time", and the creation of 5,000 jobs during construction, and 10,000 operational jobs.

Development
The construction cost in Hong Kong was covered by the Hong Kong taxpayer (whereas the construction cost in the Mainland section will be covered by the Guangdong Provincial Government and PRC's Ministry of Railways).

Hoping to be able to start construction of the Hong Kong section of the Express Rail Link (XRL) project before the end of 2009, the Executive Council approved the implementation on 20 October, paving the way for funding approval from the Finance Committee of the Legislative Council.

Appropriations for the project secured approval of the Hong Kong Legislative Council on 16 January 2010.

Service
The XRL HK Section will only serve the West Kowloon Terminus. Trains will run to Guangzhou South Station in the Shibi Township of the Panyu District in southern Guangzhou through three intermediate stations, namely, Futian, Longhua (Shenzhen North) and Humen. The expected travel time between Guangzhou South and West Kowloon stations is estimated to be 1 hour and 18 minutes, up from the previously announced 47 minutes with a total distance of 142 kilometers.

Shenzhen North station was opened on 22 June 2011 and the service was extended to Futian station on 30 December 2015.

Trains departing from Hong Kong may have destinations beyond Guangzhou, through the Wuguang High-Speed Railway and the Shiwu High-Speed Railway, or via Shenzhen North to Hangzhou and Shanghai through the Xiashen Railway and the Huhangyong Railway.

The total distance of the Hong Kong section was planned to be 26 kilometres, most of which through tunnels. The dedicated track will enable a top speed of 200 km/h; the expected travel time from Kowloon to Shenzhen's Futian station is 14 minutes.

Service between Guangzhou South and Shenzhen North stations started on 26 December 2011. The extension to Futian station, originally scheduled for 2012, was delayed until on 30 December 2015 for Futian and the 3rd quarter of 2018 during the planning process for West Kowloon Terminus.

Controversies 

The completion of the XRL HK section had been delayed on multiple occasions and continuously ran over budget, attracting criticisms from many Hong Kong protestors. Being part of the Chinese Rail Link network, with the start of commercial operations in the Hong Kong section, the Chinese authorities have created checkpoints both on the trains to Hong Kong and at the Hong Kong West Kowloon railway station, in a "Mainland Port Area" where Chinese criminal laws can be legally enforced for the first time in Hong Kong territory, as part of the bill passed in June 2018.

Protests
On 29 November 2009, a demonstration of more than 1,000 people protesting against the construction of the Express Rail link gained the attention of the local media when a group of 100 people engaged in a sit-in protest in front of the government headquarters in Central. On 18 December 2009, when the funding application was debated in the Finance Committee of the Legislative Council, a demonstration of an estimated 1,000 to 2,000 people was staged around the Legislative Council Building. The debate did not end at the time when the meeting was scheduled to be ended, and the funding application was not yet voted on. A major protest followed in January 2010.

See also 
 Guangzhou–Kowloon through train
 East Rail line
 Kowloon–Canton Railway

References

External links
 MTR High Speed Rail
 MTR Express Rail Link project details / construction

 High-speed railway lines
 Railway tunnels in Hong Kong
 Standard gauge railways in Hong Kong